Daga Dzong (formerly called Daga Trashiyangtse Dzong) is a castle or Dzong  (fortress) in the southern part of Bhutan, Dagana District. It is the district's headquarters and houses the district's Monastic Body.

History 
Zhabdrung Ngawang Namgyal deputized Dronyer Druk Namgyel in 1648 to the southern Bhutan for the unification of the country under Drukpa rule. Druk Namgyel built the dzong overlooking the valley in around 1649 and was completed after two years, in 1651. Later the Dzong housed the Cabinet Ministers under Chhoesi System introduced by the Zhabdrung. Tenpa Thinlely was elected its first Daga Penlop.

Dagana Dzong is listed as a tentative site in Bhutan's Tentative List for UNESCO inclusion.

Sources of Name 
Its name was derived from the two possible sources: Darkarla (the provincial deity) and Darkanang (realm of the White Prayer Flag). Formerly, Daga Dzong was known as Daga Trashiyangtse Dzong.

Reference 

1651 establishments in Asia 
Dzongs in Bhutan 
Palaces in Bhutan